Guarea sprucei is a species of plant in the family Meliaceae. It is endemic to Brazil.  It is threatened by habitat loss.

References

sprucei
Flora of Brazil
Critically endangered plants
Taxonomy articles created by Polbot